( The Fatherland Legend) is a national epic by Uruguayan poet Juan Zorrilla de San Martín written in 1879.

The poem is a late-19th century romantic chanson de geste of the Río de la Plata revolutionary group known as the Thirty-Three Orientals, whose actions culminated in the foundation of modern Uruguay. With 413 verses, it was written within a week and recited by the author at the dedication of the Villa de la Florida monument to independence. It was considered a feat and gained immediate popularity, which earned Zorrilla de San Martín the title of Poet of the Fatherland.

References

Epic poems in Spanish
Uruguayan poetry
Uruguayan poems
1879 poems